The women's 100 metres hurdles event at the 1977 Summer Universiade was held at the Vasil Levski National Stadium in Sofia on 20 August.

Medalists

Results

Heats

Wind:Heat 1: -0.2 m/s, Heat 2: ? m/s, Heat 3: ? m/s

Final

Wind: -0.6 m/s

References

Athletics at the 1977 Summer Universiade
1977